Walter Courtney Rowden was a British screenwriter and film director. He is sometimes referred to as William Courtney Rowden.
He was known for Corinthian Jack (1921), Daniel Deronda (1921), Simple Simon (1922), and Vanity Fair (1922). His other credits include The Prisoner of Zenda (1915), At Trinity Church I Met My Doom (1922), and Hornet's Nest (1923).

Selected filmography
Screenwriter
 The Prisoner of Zenda (1915)
 Rupert of Hentzau (1915)
 Westward Ho! (1919)
 Hobson's Choice (1920)
 Calvary (1920)
 The Sheik (1922)
 Hornet's Nest (1923)

Director
 Daniel Deronda (1921)
 Corinthian Jack (1921)
 Vanity Fair (1922)
 A Tale of Two Cities (1922)

References

External links

Bibliography
 Scott, Ian. From Pinewood to Hollywood: British Filmmakers in American Cinema, 1910-1969. Palgrave MacMillan, 2010.

Year of birth unknown
Year of death unknown
British film directors
British male screenwriters